Ajië (also known as Houailou (Wailu), Wai, and A'jie) is an Oceanic language spoken in New Caledonia. It has approximately 4,000 speakers.

Phonology

Consonants 

A glottal stop only appears after oral vowels. Different speakers may realize /v/ as a bilabial sound /β/. A nasal trill [r̃] or a retroflex [ɻ] is heard as an allophone of /r/.

Vowels

Nasal vowels

References

New Caledonian languages
Languages of New Caledonia